A correction fluid is an opaque, usually white fluid applied to paper to mask errors in text. Once dried, it can be handwritten or typed upon. It is typically packaged in small bottles, lids attached to brushes (or triangular pieces of foam) that dip into the fluid. The brush applies the fluid to the paper.

Before the invention of word processors, correction fluid greatly facilitated the production of typewritten documents. One of the first forms of correction fluid was invented in 1956 by American secretary Bette Nesmith Graham, founder of Liquid Paper. With the advent of colored paper stocks for office use, manufacturers began producing their fluids in various matching colors, particularly reds, blues and yellows.

Composition 

The exact composition of correction fluid varies between manufacturers, but most fluids are composed of an opacifying agent, a solvent (or thinner) and an adulterant 'fragrance' to discourage abuse. The opacifying agent can be composed of a mixture of titanium dioxide, latex, and other polymer resins.

Thinner originally contained toluene, which was banned due to its toxicity. Later, it contained 1,1,1-trichloroethane, a skin irritant now widely banned under the Montreal Protocol on Substances That Deplete the Ozone Layer, and then the slightly safer trichloroethylene.  Thinners currently used with correction fluid include bromopropane.  Because it contains organic solvents (volatile organic compounds), unused correction fluid thickens over time as volatile solvents escape into the air.  It can become too thick to use, and sometimes completely solidifies. Therefore, some manufacturers also sell bottles of solvent as "thinner", a few drops of which will return the correction fluid to its original liquid state. To avoid the inconveniences of organic solvents (safety and availability), some brands of fluid are water-based. However, those have the disadvantages of a longer drying time, and incompatibility with some inks (which will soak through them).

Abuse as an inhalant 
Organic solvents are psychoactive when sufficient amounts are inhaled. Such solvents are common inhalants for adolescents due, in part, to the fact that they are inexpensive in comparison to other recreational drugs. Use of correction fluid as an inhalant can cause the heart to beat rapidly and irregularly, which can cause death. An unpleasant smell is added to some brands in order to deter abusers.
Companies have worked closely with authorities in order to ensure that all the warnings are duly mentioned on packaging (card and product labels) to inform parents and younger users of the risks associated with inhaling or drinking the fluid.
India has imposed a ban on the retail sale of bottled nail polish remover and bottled correction fluid, but permits its sale in devices that provide a small amount of the chemical in a container that dispenses it in a controlled way. The Ministry of Education also banned its use in schools in 2017. The manufacturer is required to affix a warning regarding the possible adverse effects on health if the material is inhaled.

Manufacturing process 
Stainless steel tanks are used to hold  or more. Specialists must consider the mixer and temperature control system carefully, and also the formula instructions, the correct types, and the amounts of raw materials at specified times by using computer controls. This process consists of 3 methods: firstly, compounding the batch; secondly, quality control check; and thirdly, filling and packing.

Compounding the batch 
In the first phase, water will be filled into the main batch tank. The suspending agents and some of the ingredients will be added in this phase. Mixing is implemented at low rate for adequate dispersion. During the mixing, there is no air added into the mixture.

In the second phase, pigment is in the process. It will be added in suitable amount into the water. Mixing is implemented at very high rate in this process which is different from the first phase. In the mixing process, when the particle is small enough, it will be added into the main batch.

In the final phase, the resin and other necessary ingredients will be added such as colorants and preservatives.

Quality control check 
In the process of checking the quality, specialists will check in the lab for physical and chemical characteristics such as pH determination, viscosity checks, appearance and odor evaluations.

In case of mistake such as the ingredients are not enough for making correction fluid, this problem will be solved by adding more ingredients. When this process is finished, the correction fluid will be pumped to a holding tank waiting for filling the correction fluid in the next method.

Filling and packaging 
Firstly, the filling process depends on the different package of each product. The filling line and the filling heads holding play a vital role in this process. The empty bottles will be in the conveyor belt and move continuously waiting for injecting correction fluid in each bottle.

Secondly, when the filling process is finished, it comes to the packing process. All the filled bottles will be moved to the capping machine to sort the caps and tighten them.

Finally, these bottles will be put into the box for shipping to the sellers and customers.

Notable brands
Correction fluid is commonly referred to by the leading brand names. These brands include:
 Cello (Correct-X)
 Civors
 Edigs
 Joyko
 Kores
 Liquid Paper
 Oval
 Presto! by Pentel
 Snopake
 Tipp-Ex
 Twink
 White Away
 Win (SNOWLINE)
 Wite-Out

Synonyms by region
 "Liquid paper", "snopake" and "white-out" are used as general terms in the United States, Canada, Australia, and some countries in the former USSR.
 "Tipp-Ex" is used in most countries in Western Europe, Israel, South Africa and Indonesia.
  is used in France and Greece,  in Italy. 
 Twink is the leading brand, and colloquial term, for correction fluid in New Zealand.
 In the English-speaking Caribbean the term "white-paper paste" and "white-out" are used.
 In Latin America, "liquid paper" (or just "liquid") is also the colloquial term over the formal Spanish term, .
 In Brazil, "liquid paper" is also the colloquial term over the formal Portuguese term, .
 "Korektor" is used in Serbia and Poland.
 In Slovenia the term "edigs" is used (after the most common manufacturer)
 In Philippines the terms "snopake" or "liquid paper" are the common terms, both after common brands available there.
 In India the term "whitener" is common.
 In Turkey the term "daksil" (from "daktilo silgisi": typewriter eraser) is the most frequently used.

See also 
 Correction paper
 Correction tape

References 

Correction instruments
Liquids